Alphonse Hercule Matam (born 1 April 1973) is a Cameroonian weightlifter. He competed in the men's light heavyweight event at the 1992 Summer Olympics.

References

1973 births
Living people
Cameroonian male weightlifters
Olympic weightlifters of Cameroon
Weightlifters at the 1992 Summer Olympics
Place of birth missing (living people)
20th-century Cameroonian people